Schoolroom Glacier is a small glacier in Grand Teton National Park in the U.S. state of Wyoming. The glacier has many of the classic textbook details of a glacier, namely, well defined terminal and lateral moraines, crevasses, a proglacial lake (or tarn) and related features which led to the naming schoolroom.

As is true for a vast majority of glaciers worldwide, Schoolroom Glacier has been in a state of retreat for many decades, and if current climatic conditions persist, the glacier is anticipated to disappear by the year 2030, if not sooner.

See also
Retreat of glaciers since 1850
List of glaciers in the United States

References

External links
National Park Service site describing glacial monitoring and retreat of Schoolroom Glacier
Melting ice: a Schoolroom lesson

Glaciers of Grand Teton National Park